Clifford Wayne Dickeson (born 26 March 1955) is a former New Zealand cricketer who played 90 first-class matches for Northern Districts.

A left-arm spin bowler, Dickeson took a record 282 wickets for Northern Districts between 1973 and 1987. His best match figures were 11 for 142 against Wellington in 1979-80 and his best in an innings 7 for 79 the following season against Central Districts.

Dickeson also played two seasons of Minor Counties Championship cricket for Bedfordshire in 1975 and 1976, and Hawke Cup cricket for Northland and Hamilton between 1970 and 1988. He coached the Northern Districts Spirit for 11 years before he retired in 2011.

References

External links
 

1955 births
Living people
New Zealand cricketers
New Zealand cricket coaches
Northern Districts cricketers
People from Kawakawa, New Zealand
Bedfordshire cricketers